Propylphenidate (also known as PPH) is a piperidine based stimulant drug, closely related to methylphenidate, but with the methyl ester replaced by a propyl ester. It was banned in the UK as a Temporary Class Drug from April 2015 following its unapproved sale as a designer drug.

Legal status 

Propylphenidate is illegal in Sweden as of 26. January 2016, and in Finland since 2017.

See also 
 3,4-Dichloromethylphenidate
 4-Fluoromethylphenidate
 4-Methylmethylphenidate
 Dexmethylphenidate
 Ethylphenidate
 Isopropylphenidate
 HDEP-28
 HDMP-28

References 

2-Benzylpiperidines
Norepinephrine–dopamine reuptake inhibitors
Stimulants
Designer drugs
2-Piperidinyl compounds